Leaping Lena was a West German racing pigeon who got lost in Czechoslovakia during a routine 1954 flight.  When she returned home two days later, there was a message addressed to Radio Free Europe attached to one of her legs.  It read: 

It was signed "Unbowed Pilsen."

Leaping Lena was brought to the United States in August 1954, quarantined for 3 weeks, and then was used to raise money for Radio Free Europe as part of a publicity campaign for the Crusade for Freedom.

Leaping Lena was then kept at Fort Monmouth's Pigeon Breeding and Training Center.  When the Center was deactivated in 1957, fifteen hero pigeons were donated to zoos, while about a thousand others were sold to the public.

References

Further reading

External links
The following raise skepticism, noting that the Crusade for Freedom was a CIA front.

Animals in politics
Anti-communism
Individual domesticated pigeons
Czechoslovakia–United States relations